This is a list of the United States athletes who won an Olympic medal since 1992.

Summer Olympics

1992 Barcelona

1996 Atlanta

2000 Sydney

2004 Athens

2008 Beijing

2012 London

2016 Rio

2020 Tokyo

Winter Olympics

1992 Albertville

1994 Lillehammer

1998 Nagano

2002 Salt Lake

2006 Turin

2010 Vancouver

2014 Sochi

2018 PyeongChang

2022 Beijing

Medalists
Lists of Olympic medalists
Olympic medalists for the United States